Ibn Mardanish may refer to
Abu ʿAbd Allāh Muḥammad ibn Saʿd ibn Mardanīsh (died 1172), ruler of Murcia
Zayyan ibn Mardanish (died 1270), ruler of Valencia